Deh-e Zuiyeh (also Romanized as Deh-e Zū’īyeh, Deh Zū’īyeh, Deh-e Zūyeh, and Deh Zoo’eyeh; also known as Deh-e Zū) is a village in Sarbanan Rural District, in the Central District of Zarand County, Kerman Province, Iran. At the 2006 census, its population was 53, in 21 families.

References 

Populated places in Zarand County